Salis Abdul Samed (born 26 March 2000) is a Ghanaian professional footballer who plays as a defensive midfielder for  club Lens and the Ghana national team.

Club career
On 24 July 2019, Abdul Samed joined Clermont on a two-year loan deal from the JMG Academy. He made his debut with the club in a 2–2 (5–4 on penalties) Coupe de la Ligue loss to Lens on 27 August 2019. On 12 July 2021, Abdul Samed moved to Clermont on a permanent basis and signed a four-year contract.

On 24 June 2022, Abdul Samed signed for Lens in a transfer worth a reported €5 million. He signed a five-year contract with the club. He scored his first goal on 31 August 2022 against Lorient.

International career 
In November 2022, Abdual Samed participated at the 2022 FIFA World Cup with the Ghana national team.

References

External links
 
 
 
 Clermont Foot Profile

2000 births
Living people
Ghanaian footballers
Association football midfielders
JMG Academy players
Clermont Foot players
RC Lens players
Ligue 2 players
Ligue 1 players
Championnat National 3 players
Ghanaian expatriate footballers
Expatriate footballers in France
Ghanaian expatriate sportspeople in France
2022 FIFA World Cup players